On September 6, 2011, a gunman, identified as 32-year-old Eduardo Sencion, opened fire in a branch of the IHOP in Carson City, Nevada, killing four people, including three members of the National Guard, and wounding seven others before fatally shooting himself.

Shooting
At 8:58 a.m., Sencion arrived at a local strip mall in a blue minivan that was registered in his brother's name. He got out and shot and wounded a woman on a motorcycle with a Norinco MAK-90 semi-automatic rifle that had its stock removed and was converted to fully-automatic, a felony under the 1934 National Firearms Act (NFA). At around 9:00 a.m. he walked inside the center's IHOP and made his way to the back where he started shooting. He first targeted a group of uniformed National Guardsmen, all of whom were eating at the same table; five of them were shot, three of them fatally. He then targeted other patrons, killing a 67-year-old woman.

Sencion then left the restaurant and began shooting into three nearby businesses, injuring no one. During the massacre, Ralph Swagler, who owned a neighboring restaurant, grabbed his own gun with the intention of shooting Sencion, but was unable to due to the rapid gunfire. Police arrived at 9:06 a.m., in response to which Sencion put a Colt Agent pistol to his head and shot and wounded himself, later dying at the hospital. Police would later find a Romarm/CUGIR GP WASR-10 rifle and a Glock 26 Gen3 semi-automatic pistol in his van outside the restaurant. Due to the severity of the massacre and fears that it would become more widespread, Nevada officials declared a lock-down on the state capitol and Supreme Court buildings for around 40 minutes, while extra security was set up at state and military buildings in northern Nevada.

Victims
A total of five people, including the gunman, were killed in the shooting. They were identified as:
Florence Donovan-Gunderson, 67
Nevada National Guard Major Heath Kelly, 35
Nevada National Guard Sgt 1st Class Miranda McElhiney, 31
Nevada National Guard Sgt 1st Class Christian Riege, 38

Florence Donovan-Gunderson, Nevada National Guard Major Heath Kelly, and Nevada National Guard Sgt 1st Class Christian Riege were all declared dead at the scene, while Nevada National Guard Sgt 1st Class Miranda McElhiney later died at a local hospital. About three hours after the massacre, Sencion died at Noah J. Medical Center from a self-inflicted gunshot wound.

Seven other people survived the shooting with injuries, all of them caused by gunshot wounds. Four were taken to the Renown Regional Medical Center in Reno, three by helicopter, while the remaining three went to another hospital in Carson City to undergo surgery. Four were in critical condition, while the remaining three suffered minor wounds. Two of the surviving victims were members of the National Guard.

Perpetrator

Eduardo Sencion (also known as Eduardo Perez-Gonzalez; July 22, 1979September 6, 2011) was born in Mexico and had a valid U.S. passport. He had no previous criminal history and worked at his family's business located in South Lake Tahoe. Diagnosed with paranoid schizophrenia when he was eighteen years old, he had no traces of antipsychotic drugs in his body on the day of the massacre, according to toxicology reports. In January 2009, he filed for bankruptcy, listing more than $42,000 in outstanding debts for a car, several credit cards, and medical expenses. His motive for the attack is unknown by law-enforcement officials, though there was no indication that it was a terrorist attack, and that he had no known connection to the military, nor motivation for shooting the National Guardsmen.

Reaction
After the massacre, Nevada Senator Harry Reid issued a statement, saying, "I'm deeply saddened by this senseless act and extend my sympathies to those afflicted this morning. I applaud the first responders for their professionalism, and my thoughts are with the victims and their families during this difficult time." Nevada U.S. Representative Joe Heck and Nevada State Senator Ben Kieckhefer also expressed their condolences on Twitter. Nevada Governor Brian Sandoval said in a written statement, "The [Carson City] mayor and I ... want to assure all Nevadans and especially residents of Carson City that everything is being done to ensure the public's safety." Sandoval also ordered flags flown at half-staff until Friday at dusk in honor of the slain National Guardsmen. Two of the guardsmen were posthumously promoted in memory of their service: Master Sergeant Christian Riege and Lieutenant Colonel Heath Kelly.

See also
 List of rampage killers in the United States

References

2011 active shooter incidents in the United States
2011 in Nevada
2011 mass shootings in the United States
Mass shootings in the United States
Mass murder in 2011
2011 murders in the United States
21st-century mass murder in the United States
Deaths by firearm in Nevada
Murder in Nevada
Murder–suicides in Nevada
History of Carson City, Nevada
Crimes in Nevada
Attacks in the United States in 2011
Attacks on restaurants in North America
Massacres in the United States
September 2011 crimes in the United States
Mass shootings in Nevada
Attacks on buildings and structures in the United States